The Richard J. Daley Center, also known by its open courtyard Daley Plaza and named after longtime mayor Richard J. Daley, is the premier civic center of the City of Chicago in Illinois.  The Center's modernist skyscraper primarily houses offices and courtrooms for the Cook County Circuit Courts. It is adjacent to the Chicago City Hall and County Building.  The open granite paved plaza used for gatherings, protests, and events is also the site of the Chicago Picasso, a gift to the city from the artist.

Situated on Randolph and Washington Streets between Dearborn and Clark Streets, the Richard J. Daley Center is considered one of Chicago's architectural highlights.  The main building was designed in the International Style of the Second Chicago School by Jacques Brownson of the firm C. F. Murphy Associates and completed in 1965. At the time it was the tallest building in Chicago, but only held this title for four years until the John Hancock Center was completed. Originally known as the Chicago Civic Center, the building was renamed for Mayor Daley on December 27, 1976, seven days after his death. The , thirty-one story building features Cor-Ten, a self-weathering steel.  Cor-Ten was designed to rust, actually strengthening the structure and giving the building its distinctive red and brown color.  The Daley Center has 30 floors, and is the tallest flat-roofed building in the world with fewer than 40 stories (a typical  building would have 50-60 stories).

Building features
The Richard J. Daley Center houses more than 120 court and hearing rooms as well as the Cook County Law Library, offices of the Clerk of the Circuit Court, and certain court-related divisions of the Sheriff's Department.  The building also houses office space for both the city and Cook County, of which the City of Chicago is its seat of government. The windows are cor-ten steel and bronze/white tinted.

Daley Plaza
Daley Plaza is the courtyard adjacent to the building, occupying the southern half of the block occupied by the building.

The plaza is dominated by an untitled Cor-ten steel  sculpture by Pablo Picasso (usually called "The Picasso"). Completed in 1967, it was a gift to the City of Chicago from the artist.  Though controversial for its abstract form, it quickly became a Chicago landmark.  The plaza also features an in-ground fountain and an eternal flame memorial to the dead from World War I, World War II, the Korean War and the Vietnam War.

The plaza serves as a location for many civic functions including weekly farmers' markets in the summer, regular ethnic festivals, and the meeting place for Chicago's Critical Mass ride.

The plaza was used extensively in the climactic scenes of the 1980 film The Blues Brothers. The interior of the building, as well as the plaza, the Picasso, and the neighboring James R. Thompson Center are also featured in the 1993 film The Fugitive and in 2006's The Lake House. While filming the movie The Dark Knight, instead of using the Chicago Board of Trade Building as the location for the headquarters of Wayne Enterprises as in Batman Begins, film director Christopher Nolan used the Richard J. Daley Center. Mercury Records, which at one time had its headquarters in Chicago, used a photo of the Daley Center as its record label on many of its vinyl record releases in the 1970s.

Farhad Khoiee-Abbasi, a public protester, is a frequent fixture at the northwest corner of the plaza, near City Hall. Khoiee-Abbasi has been photographed here many times, with his well-dressed appearance, his odd signs, and his general refusal to speak or acknowledge those around him making him a minor celebrity.

Adjacent buildings
Adjacent to the Richard J. Daley Plaza is the landmark Chicago City Hall.  Declared a National Historic Landmark and listed on the National Register of Historic Places, it houses offices for the Mayor of Chicago, aldermen of Chicago's various wards and chambers for the Chicago City Council. Directly south of the Daley Center is the Cook County Administration Building which is full of office space for County employees. Block 37 containing 108 North State Street is to the east.

Position in skyline

See also
 Chicago architecture
 List of buildings
 List of skyscrapers
 List of tallest buildings in Chicago
 List of tallest buildings in the United States
 World's tallest structure

References

External links

 City of Chicago
 Cook County
 Richard J. Daley Center on Emporis
 Daley Plaza Eternal Flame

Articles containing video clips
Central Chicago
County courthouses in Illinois
Government buildings completed in 1965
Government buildings in Chicago
Skyscraper office buildings in Chicago
Chicago Landmarks
1965 establishments in Illinois
Circuit Court of Cook County